Frontilabrus caeruleus is a species of wrasse native to the Indian Ocean waters around the Maldives. It has also been displayed in public aquaria. This species is the only known member of its genus.

References

Labridae
Taxa named by John Ernest Randall
Endemic fauna of the Maldives
Fish described in 1989